The Fiat 3000 was the first tank to be produced in series in Italy. It became the standard tank of the emerging Italian armored units after World War I. The 3000 was based on the French Renault FT.

History
Although 1,400 units were ordered, with deliveries to begin in May 1919, the end of the war caused the original order to be canceled and only 100 were delivered. The first Fiat 3000s entered service in 1921 and were officially designated as the carro d'assalto Fiat 3000, Mod. 21 (Italian for "Fiat 3000 assault tank, Model 21"). Tests of the Model 21 revealed that the armament, consisting of two 6.5 mm machine guns, was inadequate, and adoption of a 37 mm gun as main armament was urged.

The up-gunned version of the 3000, armed with a 37/40 gun, was tested in 1929 and was officially adopted in 1930 with the designation of carro d'assalto Fiat 3000, Mod. 30. The Model 30, in addition to its improved armament, also differed from the Model 21 in that it had a more powerful engine, improved suspension, different engine compartment silhouette, and the external stores were stowed differently. Some Model 30s were also produced with two 6.5 mm machine guns as main armament, as on the Model 21, in lieu of the 37 mm gun. A limited number of Model 21 vehicles were exported to Albania, Latvia (6 in 1926), Hungary, and Abyssinia (Ethiopia) prior to 1930.

The designations of these tanks were changed prior to the outbreak of World War II, in accordance with the identification system that was adopted throughout the war by the Italians. The Model 21 was redesignated L5/21, and the Model 30 was redesignated L5/30.

Battle
The Fiat 3000 (Model 21) was first used in action in February 1926 in Libya, and subsequently also saw action against the Ethiopians in the Second Italo-Abyssinian War in 1935. It was not one of the tanks used by the Italians in Spain during the Spanish Civil War, however. With Italy's entry into World War II in June 1940, a limited number of Fiat 3000s still in service with the Italian Army were employed operationally on the Greek-Albanian front. They were also among the last Italian tanks to oppose the Allies, as in July 1943, when the Allies landed in Sicily, two Italian tank companies on the island were still equipped with the 3000. One company was dug in and their vehicles were used as fixed fortifications, while the other company was used in a mobile role to respond to the amphibious landing during the  Battle of Gela, with few of the tanks surviving the Allied drive.

See also
 Fiat 2000
 Pacification of Libya
 Ethiopian coup d'état of 1928

References

External links
Fiat 3000 at wwiivehicles.com

3000
World War I tanks of Italy
World War II tanks of Italy
Light tanks of Italy
World War I light tanks